Brian Bruce Gidney (6 April 1938 — 18 March 2019) was an English first-class cricketer and educator.

Gidney was born at Kingston upon Thames in April 1938. He was initially educated at Arundel House School in Surbiton, before receiving a scholarship to Kingston Grammar School. From there he matriculated to Queens' College at the University of Cambridge, following a spell in the Royal Air Force doing National Service. While studying at Cambridge, he played first-class cricket for Cambridge University Cricket Club in 1963, making a single appearance against the touring Pakistan Eaglets at Fenner's. Batting twice in the match as an opening batsman, he was dismissed in the Cambridge first innings for 7 runs by Asif Iqbal, while in their second innings he was dismissed for 9 runs by Farooq Hamid. Gidney also played field hockey for Cambridge and was selected for four years running in the Varsity Match against Oxford.

He accepted a teaching job at Charterhouse School following his graduation from Cambridge, where he was to teach for around a year. In 1965, he was offered a two-year teaching job at Hale School in Australia, which he accepted. It was there that he met his future wife, a school nurse from a competing school, which persuaded him to remain in Australia and become Head of Economics at the school. He remained at Hale School until 1985, before taking up a similar role at Wesley College, Perth. He had success as a junior cricket coach, managing biennial tours of a Combined Public Schoolboys of Western Australia Cricket XI to England. For his services to coaching cricket, Gidney was awarded the Australian Sports Medal in 2000. Alongside his teaching, he was also a part-time lecturer and tutor at the University of Western Australia. He retired from teaching in 1997 and from his part-time lecturing in 2012. Gidney died at Subiaco in March 2019.

References

External links

1938 births
2019 deaths
People from Kingston upon Thames
People educated at Kingston Grammar School
Alumni of Queens' College, Cambridge
English cricketers
Cambridge University cricketers
Schoolteachers from London
English emigrants to Australia